Jimmy Verdon (born November 4, 1981) is an American football defensive end who was most recently a member of the Saskatchewan Roughriders. He was originally drafted by the New Orleans Saints in the seventh round of the 2005 NFL Draft. He played college football at Arizona State.

Verdon has also been a member of the Cincinnati Bengals.

Early years
Verdon attended Pomona High School in Pomona, California and played linebacker, fullback and quarterback.

College career
Verdon attended Arizona State University. He earned second-team All-Pac-10 honors and was voted the team's Most Valuable Defensive Player in 2004. During his college career, he played in 49 games with 38 starts, making 155 tackles and 10 sacks. He majored in interdisciplinary studies/education and sociology.

Professional career

New Orleans Saints
Verdon was selected by the New Orleans Saints in the seventh round (232nd overall) in the 2005 NFL Draft. During a pre-season game against the New England Patriots, he returned a fumble for a touchdown. He made his NFL debut at the Atlanta Falcons on December 12.

After playing the preseason for the Saints, he was waived on September 8.

Cincinnati Bengals
He signed with the Cincinnati Bengals as a free agent on January 2, 2007 and was allocated to the Hamburg Sea Devils of the NFL Europa. On May 12, he suffered a torn right knee ligament and would spend the entire 2007 season on the NFL Europa Non-Football Injury list.

On April 11, 2008, Verdon was waived by the Bengals.

Saskatchewan Roughriders
On June 15, 2008, he was signed to a contract with the Saskatchewan Roughriders of the CFL. He was released by the Riders following training camp on June 21, 2008. On June 23, 2008, he was added to the Riders Developmental Squad.

Personal life
He has four kids: Malik, Gabe, Trey, and Cece.

References

1981 births
Living people
American football defensive ends
American players of Canadian football
Arizona State Sun Devils football players
Cincinnati Bengals players
Hamburg Sea Devils players
New Orleans Saints players
Saskatchewan Roughriders players
Sportspeople from Pomona, California
Players of American football from California